Anolis campbelli is an endangered species of lizard in the family Dactyloidae. The species is native to Guatemala and extreme southeastern Mexico.

Etymology
The specific name, campbelli, is in honor of American herpetologist Jonathan A. Campbell.

Geographic range
A. campbelli is found in western Guatemala and in the adjacent Mexican state of Chiapas.

Habitat

Reproduction
A. campbelli is oviparous.

References

Further reading
Köhler G (2008). Reptiles of Central America, 2nd Edition. Offenbach, Germany: Herpeton Verlag. 400 pp. . 
Köhler G, Smith EN (2008). "A New Species of Anole of the Norops schiedei Group from Western Guatemala (Squamata: Polychrotidae)". Herpetologica 64 (2): 216–223. (Norops campbelli, new species).

Anoles
Endemic fauna of Guatemala
Reptiles of Guatemala
Reptiles described in 2008
Taxa named by Gunther Köhler